Logarji is a small settlement in the Mišja dolina valley west of Velike Lašče in central Slovenia. The entire Municipality of Velike Lašče is part of the traditional region of Lower Carniola and is now included in the Central Slovenia Statistical Region.

Name
The name Logarji is a collective toponym, referring to a settlement where several people with the surname Logar lived.

Mass grave
Logarji is the site of a mass grave associated with the Second World War. The Oplotje Cave Mass Grave is located south of a forest road in the woods southwest of the village. It contains the remains of undetermined victims.

Cultural heritage

In the forest southwest of Logarji, south of the road to Zgonče, there is also a memorial to Angela Škulj (1919–1942) from Brankovo, who was killed by Village Guard forces. The monument consists of a rough stone pyramid with a plaque affixed to it. The memorial is surrounded by a metal fence and was unveiled in 1980.

References

External links

Logarji on Geopedia

Populated places in the Municipality of Velike Lašče